Evelyn Roberts (28 August 1886 – 30 November 1962) was an English stage and film actor. He made his stage debut in 1918 after serving in WW I; and his theatre work included the original Broadway production of R.C. Sherriff's Journey's End in 1929-1930.

Selected filmography
 Bolibar (1928)
 Say It with Music (1932)
 One Precious Year (1933)
 The Melody-Maker (1933)
 Anne One Hundred (1933)
 Purse Strings (1933)
 Sorrell and Son (1934)
 The Broken Rosary (1934)
 Sing As We Go (1934)
 The Feathered Serpent (1934)
 No Limit (1935)
 A Romance in Flanders (1937) 
 Keep Fit (1937)
 Return of the Scarlet Pimpernel (1937)
 I've Got a Horse (1938)
 The Second Mr. Bush (1940)
 The Midas Touch (1940)
 The Winslow Boy (1948)
 The Heart of the Matter (1953)
 The Clue of the Missing Ape (1953)
 The Green Scarf (1954)
 Man of the Moment (1955)
 A Touch of the Sun (1956)
 The Spaniard's Curse (1958)

References

External links
 
 

1886 births
1962 deaths
English male stage actors
English male film actors
Actors from Reading, Berkshire
20th-century English male actors